Aleksandra Jegdić (born 9 October 1994) is a Serbian volleyball player for SC Potsdam and the Serbian national team.

Jegdić started playing volleyball at school at the age of nine. In Serbia she played for Radnički Belgrade, Kolubara Lazarevac and OK Spartak Subotica. She also took part in European Cup competitions. In 2018, she was signed by the German Bundesliga club SC Potsdam.

She participated at the 2022 FIVB Volleyball Women's World Championship.

Awards

National team
2022 World Championship -  Gold Medal

References

External links

 

1994 births
Living people
Serbian women's volleyball players
Sportspeople from Belgrade
Expatriate volleyball players in Germany
Serbian expatriate sportspeople in Germany
Liberos